Maskwacis Cultural College (MCC) is a private post-secondary institution within the Four Nations of Maskwacis, Alberta, Canada. MCC offers programs from basic adult literacy, two-year college diplomas, to university transfer programs.

Partnerships
Maskwacis Cultural College is a member of the First Nation and Adult Higher Education Consortium, a non-profit organization in Western Canada, which coordinates the efforts of its members to provide quality adult and higher education, controlled entirely by people of the First Nations.

History
In 1974, the Four Bands of Hobbema established Maskwacis Cultural Centre under the Cultural/Educational Centres Program of Indian Affairs Canada. From 1974 to 1986, the Maskwacis Cultural Centre's mission was to preserve Plains Cree culture and history, to support Cree language development and to provide Post-secondary opportunities to members of the Four Nations by brokering courses from various public institutions.

In 1986, the Board of Governors, with assistance and support of the Chiefs of Samson, Ermineskin, Louis Bull and Montana Bands, sought formal recognition for Maskwachees Cultural Centre as a post-secondary institution. In July 1988, the Legislative Assembly of Alberta passed the Maskwacîs Cultural College Act (Bill PR20), establishing the Maskwachees Cultural College as a Private Post-Secondary Institution in Alberta with authority to grant certification to students at the Certificate and Diploma levels.

In 1987, Maskwacis Cultural College's university courses were recognized as transfer equivalencies to the University of Alberta, the University of Calgary, the University of Lethbridge and Augustana University College. Since then Maskwachees Cultural College's university courses were brokered to Yellowhead Tribal Council in Edmonton and the MCC Early Childhood Development Program was brokered to Lesser Slave Lake Indian Regional Council at Grouard, Alberta.

Programs
Students can complete the first two years of various university degrees at MCC, as well as a variety of upgrading, certificate and diploma programs.

Academics
Students are instructed by professors from affiliated universities and colleges. Some of the academic programs offered at MCC are as follows:
 Adult Basic Education (ABE)
 Bachelor of Education
 Bachelor of Arts
 Academic Upgrading
 Cree Language Instructor Training Diploma
 Diploma leading to Bachelor of Education
 Diploma leading to Bachelor of Arts
 First Nations Management Diploma
 Indigenous Social Work Diploma
 Educational Assistant (Special Needs)
 First Nations Management
 Indigenous Social Work
 Maskwacis Administrative Assistant
 Off Campus Student Support
 Prior Learning Assessment & Recognition (PLAR) Program
 University & College Preparation (UCEPP)
 University outreach program

Scholarships and bursaries
The Government of Canada sponsors an Aboriginal Bursaries Search Tool that lists over 680 scholarships, bursaries, and other incentives offered by governments, universities, and industry to support Aboriginal post-secondary participation.

See also

List of tribal colleges and universities

External links
Maskwacis Cultural College

References

Colleges in Alberta
Indigenous universities and colleges in North America
First Nations education
Community colleges
Educational institutions established in 1988
1988 establishments in Alberta